International Congress on World Evangelization may refer to:

The First International Congress on World Evangelization held in 1974 in Lausanne, Switzerland
The Second International Congress on World Evangelization held in 1989 in Manila, the Philippines
The Third Lausanne Congress on World Evangelization held in 2010 in Cape Town, South Africa